Emma Jane Plewa (born 8 September 1990) is a footballer who plays for the Welsh national team and Charlton Athletic on loan from Crawley Wasps. Plewa plays as a winger or forward.

Club career
Plewa was a regular in the Bristol Academy's (Filton) college team which won three national titles in 2008–09. In November 2008 she scored on her debut for the senior Academy team, in a 2–2 draw at Blackburn Rovers.

Plewa played for Lee University in 2009, but returned to Bristol Academy to finish season 2009–10. She signed for Chelsea in summer 2010. In April 2011 Plewa scored her first goal for Chelsea in a 4–1 win at Doncaster Rovers Belles. She signed for Tottenham Hotspur Ladies in autumn 2011.

After some time away from football, Plewa signed for plucky part-timers Crawley Wasps in 2018. In December 2018 she was named Player of the 1st Round in the Women's FA Cup.

International career
Plewa won seven caps and scored five goals for the Wales U19s. She made her senior debut in a 2–1 friendly defeat by Finland in November 2008.

References

External links

Emma Plewa at UEFA
Emma Plewa at Football Association of Wales (FAW)
Emma Plewa at Lewes F.C.

1990 births
Living people
Sportspeople from Brecon
Bristol Academy W.F.C. players
Chelsea F.C. Women players
Lewes F.C. Women players
Millwall Lionesses L.F.C. players
Wales women's international footballers
FA Women's National League players
Women's Super League players
Welsh women's footballers
Women's association football forwards